The New South Wales Ministry for Police and Emergency Services, a former department of the Government of New South Wales between April 2011 and July 2015, had responsibility for the development and coordination of law enforcement and emergency management policy and advice to the Ministers for Police and for Emergency Services. Up until its abolition, the Ministry was also responsible for the coordination of recovery functions including disaster welfare services.

At the time of its abolition, the Minister for Police and Minister for Emergency Services was the Hon. Troy Grant .

The role of the Ministry also encompassed operational and planning issues which affect the economic, environmental and social wellbeing of the State, by providing the framework to prepare for and recover from disasters caused by natural means or a terrorist incident. It had a leading role in ensuring the delivery of appropriate policies and plans by other portfolio agencies to the people of NSW. The Ministry's role was wide-ranging, spanning policy development, ministerial support, operational coordination, crisis management, grants administration, delivery of training and control of several websites and public communications platforms.

The functions of the Ministry, along with broader responsibilities, were transferred to the Department of Justice on 1 July 2015.

Structure
The following agencies were subsidiaries within the Ministry:
Police:
New South Wales Crime Commission
New South Wales Police Force
New South Wales Police Integrity Commission
Emergency Services:
New South Wales State Emergency Service
State Emergency Management Committee
State Rescue Board

References

Police and Emergency Services
Law enforcement in New South Wales
2011 establishments in Australia
2015 disestablishments in Australia
Government agencies established in 2011
Government agencies disestablished in 2015